Casa do Pessoal do Porto do Lobito or simply CPPL is an Angolan multisports club based in Lobito, Benguela. The club's handball team competes at the domestic level, at the Benguela Provincial Handball Championship and at the Angola Women's Handball League.

The club is named after its major sponsor, the Lobito Harbour.

Honours
National Championship:
Winner (0): 
 Runner Up (0) :
Angola Cup:
Winner (0): 
 Runner Up (0) :
Angola Super Cup:
Winner (0): 
 Runner Up (0) :
CHAB Club Champions Cup:
Winner (0): 
 Runner Up (0) :
CHAB Babacar Fall Super Cup:
Winner (0): 
 Runner Up (0) :
CHAB Cup Winner's Cup:
Winner (0): 
 Runner Up (0) :

Squad

Players

See also
C.P.P.L. Basketball
Federação Angolana de Andebol

References

Sports clubs in Angola
Angolan handball clubs
Benguela Province